Mcneil Clarke (July 23, 1838 – February 29, 1872) was an Ontario lawyer and political figure. He represented Grenville South in the Legislative Assembly of Ontario from 1867 to 1872.

He was born in Derry, Ireland in 1838. He was called to the Upper Canada bar in 1866. Clarke served as mayor of Prescott from 1866 to 1867. He was elected to the provincial legislature in 1867 and died in 1872 during his second term in office.

External links 

The Canadian parliamentary companion and annual register, 1871, HJ Morgan

1838 births
1872 deaths
Canadian people of Ulster-Scottish descent
Irish emigrants to pre-Confederation Ontario
Mayors of places in Ontario
People from Leeds and Grenville United Counties
Progressive Conservative Party of Ontario MPPs